A tax cap places an upper bound on the amount of government tax a person might be required to pay.  In this case the tax is said to be capped.

Tax terms